NadimaČ is a Serbian thrash metal band from Belgrade, formed in 2003.

History
Ristić and Pavlović began the band and completed the lineup with guitarist and vocalist, Miloš "Krle Macola" Krstić and Dušan "Glasna Komora" Koprivica. They recorded a demo in 2007, Vukodlak Metal (Werewolf Metal). In early 2008 band changed its line-up. It featured its founding members – Zec and Draganče, guitarist Stefan "Ćora" Ćorović, and a former Daggerspawn vocalist Danilo "Dača" Trbojević. The new lineup recorded a debut EP, Metal je Rat (2009) (Metal is War). They signed with Chinese record label Area Death Productions and released their first studio album, Državni Neprijatelj Broj Kec (State Enemy Number Ace ) in 2009.

Members
Current line-up
 Danilo "Dača" Trbojević – Vocals (2008–present)
 Marko "Zec" Pavlović – Bass (2003–present)
 Dragan "Draganče" Ristić – Drums (2003–present)
 Stefan "Ćora" Ćorović – Guitar (2008–present)

Discography
2007 : Vukodlak Metal (Werewolf Metal)
2009 : Metal je Rat (Metal is War)
2009 : Državni Neprijatelj Broj Kec (Public Enemy Number Ace)
2011 : Po Kratkom Postupku (By a Short Procedure)
2013 : Nejebanježivesile (Notgivingashit, literal translation "notfuckinganyliveforce")
2015: Manifest Protiv Sudbine (Manifest Against Destiny)
2017: "Besnilo" (Rage)

References

http://www.nadimac.com/Biography.aspx

External links
 http://www.metal-sound.net/interviews.php?read=nadimac

Serbian thrash metal musical groups
Speed metal musical groups
Musical groups established in 2003
Musical groups from Belgrade
Musical quartets